Brian Heward (17 July 1935 – 21 April 2012) was an English professional footballer who made 234 appearances in the Football League playing for Scunthorpe United and Lincoln City. He played as a centre half.

Life and career
Heward was born in Lincoln, Lincolnshire, and began his football career as a junior with Second Division club Scunthorpe United. He made his first-team debut in March 1954, and played more frequently after established centre-half Dick White joined Liverpool. He moved on to Lincoln City, newly relegated to the Third Division, for "a small fee" in the 1961 close season. Over the next six season, Heward made 114 appearances in all competitions, scoring twice.

After his retirement as a player, Heward became chairman of Lincoln City's fundraising body, the Red Imps Association. He was active in the Federation of Small Businesses, chairing the local branch for many years, and represented the Lincolnshire region on the federation's national governing body, becoming the longest serving national councillor.

Heward was married with a family. He died in South Hykeham, Lincolnshire, in April 2012 at the age of 76.

References

1935 births
2012 deaths
Sportspeople from Lincoln, England
English footballers
Association football defenders
Scunthorpe United F.C. players
Lincoln City F.C. players
English Football League players